Michael Mack (born December 21, 1978) is a German entrepreneur.

Life 
Mack was born in Freiburg im Breisgau, West Germany. He is the son of Roland Mack and his wife Marianne. He has two siblings, Thomas (born January 4, 1981) and Ann-Kathrin (born October 19, 1989). Mack completed a tri-national study program from 1999 to 2003 in the field of International Business Management in Basel, Lörrach and Colmar. In 2003, Mack graduated with a degree in business administration. He started his career in the family business in his early youth and was since then continuously working inside the park during his whole childhood. During his studies, he completed internships in amusement parks in Germany and all over the world.

In 2002, Mack established his first own company, Mack Media. This company creates 3D/4D movies and virtual reality coasters. In 2013 the idea of a virtual rollercoaster was born and resulted in the start-up VR Coaster. In 2015, the first VR coaster was officially launched in Europa-Park. The VR coaster in combination with a specially created Coastiality app received the Deutschen Computerspielpreis, a award which is given by Verband der deutschen Games-Branche e.V. and German Bundestag.
The German weekly magazine Wirtschaftswoche described Mack as a pioneer in this field.

Since 2005, Mack is strengthening the cooperation between Mack Rides GmbH & Co KG in Waldkirch and Europa Park. He is also active in the management of the Mack Rides GmbH & Co KG as a part of the family business. In addition, since April 2007, he's responsible for Mack Solutions, as well as the strategic business development entertainment and the construction management of the amusement Park.

In 2017, he became executive director of the Europa-Park. His father, Roland Mack, is still part of the family business. In the same year, Mack founded the label Mack Music and soon after the production company Mack Animation. Michael Mack is producer of the German Kids Choice Award (Nickelodeon). Michael Mack is also a pioneer in virtual reality. In 2015, he founded VR Coaster with its product Coastiality combining virtual reality experiences and rollercoasters. In 2018, he founded MackNeXT, a creative thinktank working on the fusion of technology and classical entertainment. In 2020, the VR entertainment company YULLBE was launched, offering virtual reality experiences for individuals and groups. He also initiated the AUREA Awards, that took place for the first time in November 2018 and honours VR/AR projects.

Mack started the halloween event Horror Nights - Traumatica, that won several prizes at the ScareCON.

Mack attracted attention by planning a cable car across the Rhine to France. This cable car is primarily designed to relieve traffic and contribute to a possible reduction of the required parking areas.

He met to talk about the project the French President Emmanuel Macron and the minister president of Baden-Württemberg Winfried Kretschmann.

Mack is a member of the European board of International Association of Amusement Parks and Attractions and in the board of Governors of the Liseberg Applause Award.

Honorary consul 
In August 2018 Mack became French Honorary Consul. He got the exequatur from the ambassador of France Anne-Marie Descôtes.

Awards 
In 2016, the Capital magazine listed Michael Mack among “Germany’s Top 40 under 40” and honoured him as an influential young entrepreneur. In the same year, Mack received the CampdenFB Award in the category Top Next-Generation Entrepreneur, which is awarded by the eponymous British business magazine and the French private bank Société Générale. In 2020 he was voted as the Hotel Manager of the Year.
 Michael Mack was voted as Innovator of the Year by the famous business magazine "Die Deutsche Wirtschaft" in 2020.

Mack has been included in the blooloop 50, an annual published list of notable theme park industry influencers, for three consecutive years from 2019 to 2021.

References 

1978 births
Living people
21st-century German businesspeople
Businesspeople from Freiburg im Breisgau